Getpura is a village in Ambala district, Haryana, India.

Demographics
Per the 2011 Census of India, Getpura had a total population of 1146 people;596 of those male and 550 female.

References

Villages in Ambala district